Charles "Chuck" Lane also known as The Jester is a fictional character, a Golden Age superhero created by Paul Gustavson and published by Quality Comics. He first appeared in Smash Comics #22 (May 1941). Like most of Quality's characters, the Jester was later purchased by DC Comics and incorporated into their universe. Though little used by the company, he appeared in All-Star Squadron #31 and #60 and Starman #46. The character's last Golden Age appearance was in Smash Comics #85 (Oct 1949).

Fictional character biography
Rookie cop Chuck Lane learns that he is a direct descendant of a medieval court jester. Because of this, and the fact that he feels he is not doing enough good as a cop alone, he becomes a colorfully costumed adventurer known as the "Jester". The Jester is a comical crime fighter who makes laughing-stocks out of the criminals he fights. He is known to be an unpredictable hero whose eerie laugh and jingling bells are an ominous sign to his enemies. His costume is worn under his police uniform.

According to Jess Nevins' Encyclopedia of Golden Age Superheroes, "most of the Jester's enemies are ordinary humans, but there is the occasional name villain like the stoic gangster Stoneface and the femme fatale Lady Satan".

The Jester becomes a member of both the All-Star Squadron and Uncle Sam's Freedom Fighters. His last recorded mission is in 1952, and sometime after that he gives up being the Jester to become a normal cop again.

In modern times, an aged Jester is the head of a group of patriotic radicals known as The Arcadians, seeking to "cleanse" America of its "corrupt" governments. To this end, he has his underlings (among whom is his grandson, Charles, who has taken on his costumed identity) kidnap the Vice President and his wife, with the ransom being the recovering of mystical artifacts by the Freedom Fighters. When government agents track the group's communications to Lane's home, he sets off powerful explosives, killing the agents and himself along with them.

Powers and abilities
The Jester has no superpowers, but is an Olympic-level athlete and a brilliant hand-to-hand combatant and in some later adventures is aided by a small flying sphere with a smiling face and handles on the side called "Quinopolis". He is also a skilled detective, trained in various techniques of police procedure.

In other media
A different version of The Jester appears in the 2010 film Justice League: Crisis on Two Earths, voiced by James Patrick Stuart. The Jester is a heroic version of the Joker from a parallel earth and is a member of that version's Justice League. He sacrificed himself allowing his partner, that earth's Lex Luthor to cross into another dimension to get help.

References

External links
Jester at Don Markstein's Toonopedia. Archived from the original on October 8, 2016.
Earth-2 Jester Index
Jester Profile

Comics characters introduced in 1941
DC Comics superheroes
Golden Age superheroes
Fictional jesters
Quality Comics superheroes